Clepardia Kraków (KS Clepardia Kraków) is a Polish football club based in Prądnik Biały district  of Kraków. They currently play in the IV Liga, the fifth tier of the Polish football league.

History 

The "Krowodrza – Modrzejówka" Sports Society was founded in 1909 as one of the earliest clubs in Krakow. Initially, it's ground was located on Lubelska Street, next to a military hospital, and later on the premises of the current military unit on Wrocławska Street.

The "Prądnicki" Sports Club was established in 1930 as "KS Prądnik". Its operation was interrupted by World War II, and it was reactivated in 1955. Since 1956, the club's football ground was at Prądnicka Street.

In 1967, after the merger of the two clubs, the Inter-Factory District Sports Club "Clepardia"' was established.

Over the years, the club had sport sections of football, handball, judo. Currently, the football sections (at all age levels) and judo are functioning.

Squad 

Trener:

Current coaching staff

Sources:

References

External links 
 

Football clubs in Kraków
Football clubs in Poland
Association football clubs established in 1909
1909 establishments in Poland